Daniella Mastricchio (born November 18, 1987) is an Argentine actress and singer.

Career 
Daniella Mastricchio began her career in television with an advertisement for Banco Río in 1991.

After several television advertisements, in 1995, she was summoned by Cris Morena to be part of the cast of Chiquititas. From 1996 to 1998, she performed the theatrical seasons of Chiquititas. In August 2001, she makes a small participation in the youth television series Chiquititas. In 2001, she was summoned by Cris Morena for the special Chiquititas de Oro where she and the most prominent of all seasons came together to receive the award Chiquititas de Oro.

In 2002, she was part of the cast of the television series Kachorra.

In 2003, she makes a small participation in the television series Máximo corazón.

In 2015, she performed the play La que nunca estuvo. In 2015, she performed the play Un cuento Atrapasueños.

In 2017, she performed the play El tiro por la culata.

Personal life 
From the age of 14 she had a boyfriend named Maxi. In 2005, when Daniella was 18 years old, she became a mother for the first time of a child they named Valentín.

Daniella spent 8 years in a relationship. In 2012, she gave birth to her second child, a girl, whom they called Sol Morena, name given by the character she played in Chiquititas and in honor of Cris Morena.

On July 7, 2016, she got married in a civil ceremony with Mauro Yakimiuk. In 2017, she gave birth to her third child, a boy, whom they called Bautista Yakimiuk. After a year of being married, they divorced in 2017.

Filmography

Television programs

Television

Theater

Discography

Soundtrack albums 

 1995 — Chiquititas Vol. 1
 1996 — Chiquititas Vol. 2
 1997 — Chiquititas Vol. 3
 1998  — Chiquititas Vol. 4

See also
 List of Argentines

External links
  Argentina

1987 births
Living people
Argentine actresses
Argentine people of Italian descent
People from Buenos Aires